The Official Bootleg is a live album by Rudess/Morgenstein Project, made up of Jordan Rudess and Rod Morgenstein, released in 2001.  The album is made up of tracks recorded during live shows taking place from April 1997 to February 1999.

Track listing
All pieces are composed by Jordan Rudess and Rod Morgenstein.
"Over the Edge" – 6:37
"Drop the Puck" – 5:29
"Crossing Over" – 7:12
"Don't Look Down" – 7:29
"Night Wind" – 7:58
"Dead in the Water" – 6:17
"It's a Mystery" – 7:25
"Daylight"  – 4:26

Personnel
Jordan Rudess - keyboards
Rod Morgenstein - drums

2001 live albums
Jordan Rudess albums
Rod Morgenstein albums
Collaborative albums